Rodica Maria Şerban, née Florea (born 26 May 1983) is a Romanian rower. She achieved success in women's eight, where she won a gold medal at the 2004 Summer Olympics, bronze at the 2008 Summer Olympics and a silver medal at the 2005 World Rowing Championships.

References 

Living people
Romanian female rowers
Olympic gold medalists for Romania
Olympic bronze medalists for Romania
Olympic rowers of Romania
Rowers at the 2004 Summer Olympics
Rowers at the 2008 Summer Olympics
1983 births
Place of birth missing (living people)
Olympic medalists in rowing
Medalists at the 2008 Summer Olympics
Medalists at the 2004 Summer Olympics
European Rowing Championships medalists